Moon Girl (Lunella Lafayette) is a superhero appearing in American comic books published by Marvel Comics, created by writers Brandon Montclare and Amy Reeder and artist Natacha Bustos. The character first appeared in Moon Girl and Devil Dinosaur #1 (November 2015). Lunella is a 9-year-old girl who is described as the smartest character in the Marvel Universe. Somewhat replacing Moon-Boy, she is paired with Devil Dinosaur, with whom she shares a mental link due to being an Inhuman.

Publication history
The character was created by writers Brandon Montclare and Amy Reeder (who also designed the character), and artist Natacha Bustos, first appearing in Moon Girl and Devil Dinosaur #1 (November 2015).

The genesis of the character came from editor Mark Paniccia, who is a fan of the character Devil Dinosaur and, along with editor Emily Shaw, had hired Montclare and Reeder to pen the basis for a new series that involved the character ending up in modern day. They came up with the idea of Devil Dinosaur interacting with a girl and fell in love with the idea of working with a hero who wasn't a "regular cape-and-tights superhero". Reeder explains the primary inspiration for the creation of the character:

They also viewed the series as a direct sequel to the Moon-Boy and Devil Dinosaur series from Jack Kirby, hence the first villains that Moon Girl and Devil Dinosaur face are the Killer-Folk.

Artist Natacha Bustos found the character a relief from the norm of other typical superheroes. She was primarily inspired by the clear diversity that Moon Girl and Devil Dinosaur promoted, further comparing the character Lunella to herself. She compared her story to a "Ghibli one" due to the immense relationship between the title characters.

Issue #47 of Moon Girl and Devil Dinosaur (released November 2019) has been billed as the final issue of the series.

Fictional character biography

Heroic beginnings
Lunella Lafayette is a young African-American girl who is the daughter of Aria Lafayette and James Lafayette. She daydreams and loves to invent. Despite possessing an astoundingly large intellect, Lunella is unable to get into better schools and attends Public School 20 Anna Silver. Her classmates make fun of her and dub her Moon Girl because of these qualities.

In the Savage Land, a group of Killer Folk got their hands on the sacred Nightstone. Moon-Boy and Devil Dinosaur fought to reclaim it, but Moon Boy died when the Killer Folk were sucked into a vortex through time by the Nightstone. Moon Boy's dying wish was for Devil Dinosaur to reclaim the Nightstone and avenge him.

Going through the portal, Devil Dinosaur ended up in New York City. The Nightstone had fallen into the hands of Lunella, who deduced the Nightstone was actually a Kree Omni-Wave Projector. Lunella had identified the Inhuman gene within her own DNA and feared being transformed into a monster due to the changes brought about by Terrigen Mist. Due to several Terrigen clouds that had been drifting around the city following the Inhumans' detonation of a Terrigen bomb, she took drastic action and intended to use the Nightstone to find a way to remove the Inhuman DNA. With Lunella refusing to give up the Nightstone, Devil Dinosaur was forced to bring her on his rampage through the city as he searched for the Killer Folk. Although Devil Dinosaur fought the Killer Folk, they managed to escape with the Nightstone.

Lunella ended up harboring Devil Dinosaur in her laboratory that she had built in the depths of her school, growing more and more frustrated that she was stuck with the "big red dummy" but found him useful when he helped save the lives of her teacher and class during a fire. However, Amadeus Cho's Hulk form arrived, seeking to apprehend Devil Dinosaur for his earlier rampage and accused him of the fire. Lunella refused, declaring that she needed Devil Dinosaur and, growing frustrated with Amadeus patronizing her and undermining her intelligence, drew out a few homemade weapons to fight him, but only accidentally ended up knocking out Devil Dinosaur.

Lunella, feeling responsible for Devil Dinosaur's arrest and, feeling kinship to the beast stuck in a place he did not belong, broke him out under the moniker of Moon Girl, a nickname the other students used to bully her. After the Killer Folk - who had conquered territory previously owned by the Yancy Street Gang – failed to kidnap Lunella from school to be their blood sacrifice to the Nightstone on a full moon, Lunella decided to end things. She and Devil Dinosaur fought the Killer Folk once more and won, reclaiming the Nightstone. Lunella hoped she could finally use it to ensure she would not transform into an Inhuman, but at that precise moment she was caught in a Terrigen cloud.

After terrigenesis
Devil Dinosaur took Lunella's cocoon to her lab and watched over it for several days until she hatched. Lunella was at first relieved she had not changed physically, but was dismayed to learn her Inhuman power caused her consciousness and that of Devil Dinosaur's to switch. Devil Dinosaur proceeded to make her even more ostracized at school due to freaking out in class and attacking other students while Lunella rampaged through the city. Eventually though they returned to normal.

Devil Dinosaur and Moon Girl's next opponent came in the form of Kid Kree - a misunderstood Kree boy who had failed to enter the academy twice, who sought to capture an Inhuman to impress his father and make a name for himself on Earth as Captain Marvel had - who disguised himself as a new student, Marvin Ellis, in Lunella's class. Moon Girl and Devil Dinosaur fought Kid Kree several times, once being separated by Ms. Marvel, who recognized their fight as the childish squabble it was, but still entrusted Moon Girl with a device to contact her if things ever got out of hand.

Lunella is then approached by Hulk, who gives her the Banner B.O.X. (Brain Omnicompetence EXaminer), and is surprised when she solves it in mere seconds, proving that Lunella is the smartest person on Earth. After consulting experts, Moon Girl, Hulk and Devil Dinosaur encounter Mole Man, who was attacking the city with a group of monsters. The next day, at her lab, Lunella ends up having a vision of herself in the future, where she is approached by Earth's smartest heroes. After school, she is approached by the Thing, who takes her for a walk when Hulk appears. When the two start fighting, Moon Girl and Devil Dinosaur manage to contain them while protecting the civilians, until both of them are left unconscious. Meanwhile, Doctor Doom is surprised to discover that Moon Girl is considered the smartest person on Earth and vows to prove himself superior. During science class, Lunella is attacked by robot drones until she is saved by Riri Williams. They follow the drones to a nearby alley, where Moon Girl encounters Doctor Doom. After Doom escapes, Moon Girl and Ironheart go to Moon Girl's secret lab, where they discover that the energy signatures of the drones are mystic in origin. While tracing Doom's location, Moon Girl and Devil Dinosaur arrive at the Sanctum Sanctorum and are found by Doctor Strange. Waking up from a dream, Lunella is reunited with Devil, who was shrunk down by Strange. While walking back home, Moon Girl and two of her classmates are attacked by Doctor Doom and his Doombots. Moon Girl uses an enlargement potion on herself to help Doctor Strange fight Doom and his robots. A few nights later, while installing an energy sensing probe, Moon Girl is found by five members of the X-Men.

Arriving at an abandoned mall, Moon Girl reengineers a Cerebro helmet with the Omni-Wave Projector to locate Doom, only for her and the X-Men to travel back to the 1980s. Once there, Doctor Doom arrives with an army of Doombots. The X-Men and Devil fight the Doombots until Moon Girl takes off the helmet, sending them back to the present, where they discover that Doom is actually a Doombot. Lunella takes the Doombot to her lab to analyze it. Lunella later makes a major discovery about her Inhuman power: it only activates during a full moon. She then encounters an army of Doombots, along with Thing, Hulk, Ms. Marvel, Ironheart, Doctor Strange, Kid Kree and the Killer Folk, who went to her aid after being recruited by Lunella.

Robot double
Lunella then receives a call for help from an alien girl named Illa and, after building a spaceship, goes to space with Devil and crash lands on a moon. While exploring, Lunella discovers that Illa is the moon. She soon realizes that Illa is lonely and wants company and does not understand Lunella at all. After a brief fight between Devil and some giant bugs, Lunella leaves, despite Illa's objections. In the process, Lunella is sent to a parallel universe where she meets another version of herself and Devil Dinosaur. Meanwhile, the Doombot head creates robotic versions of Lunella to avoid suspicions of her absence. After fighting their counterparts, Devil Girl and Moon Dinosaur, Lunella and Devil get back on their spacecraft and return to Illa who tells them that they will never leave her. Back home, the Doombot head begins to have problems with one of Lunella robots. Moon Girl and Devil manage to find Ego the Living Planet and reunite him with Illa, while the Doombot discovers that the Lunella robot is acting independently. Moon Girl and Devil Dinosaur later made use of a time machine to prevent Moon-Boy's death.

Meanwhile, the Doombot head has created multiple Moon Girl replacement robots who to his surprise are acting like real little girls. He tells them that they will be obsolete when the real Lunella returns. While up in space Lunella has united Ego and Illa as a family. On the way to Earth she uses the Omniwave projector to tearfully return Devil Dinosaur to Moon Boy in the Savage Land, where she thinks he belongs, and then returns to New York, where she tosses it away in the trash. Later, realizing that she still needs help, she begins checking out other superheroes in the search for a potential partner. She tries several while on various adventures, but this fails and when faced with the Super Skrull she enlists Ben Grimm and Johnny Storm and uses H.E.R.B.I.E. to relocate Devil Dinosaur and bring him back in a Fantastic Four uniform of his own. They defeat Super Skrull and Lunella realizes that she and Devil Dinosaur do not belong in the Fantastic Four, but that they do belong together. She apologizes for sending him away and he readily forgives her.

Further team ups
During the Monsters Unleashed storyline, Devil Dinosaur was with Moon Girl when she was studying the different Leviathon attacks. Later, Kei Kawade demonstrates his abilities to the heroes present by summoning Devil Dinosaur, though Moon Girl was also brought along during Devil Dinosaur's summoning. When the Leviathon Servitors attack the Baxter Building, Kei Kawade summons Devil Dinosaur to help fight them. Moon Girl, Devil Dinosaur and other heroes later encounter other monsters until the Leviathon Queen is defeated by Kei Kawade and his new creations.

During the Secret Empire storyline, Devil Dinosaur and Moon Girl join up with Daisy Johnson's Secret Warriors. After rescuing Karnak from a prison camp, the Warriors encounter the Howling Commandos after falling into a trap. While driving West, the team is found by the X-Men. After escaping New Tian, the team meets Dark Beast, an evil version of Beast, who's tortured by Daisy and Karnak on information of an Inhuman who can help them. After receiving their information, the team encounters Mister Hyde along with Hydra's Avengers. After a brief fight, the team is captured until they break out when Daisy uses her powers to destroy the Helicarrier they were in. While trying to break Devil out of his cage, Moon Girl meets Leer, the Inhuman Karnak mentioned, who knocks her unconscious when the Helicarrier crash lands. Fortunately, Moon Girl and Devil have switched brains just in time, enabling Moon Girl to lead the Warriors to an Inhuman prison camp. There, the Warriors plan a jailbreak with the imprisoned Inhumans when the Underground resistance arrives to help them. It is later revealed that Leer is Karnak's son and that Karnak had sold him to Mr. Sinister to help activate his powers.

In Gwenpool #25, Moon Girl, Devil Dinosaur, and another superhero team Power Pack briefly bust through the wall of the Marvel Universe's versions of Gwen's parents while she explains where she and her brother came from. They are surprisingly okay with it.

Dealing with Princess
Wilson Fisk recently revealed his secret daughter Princess by enrolling her in Lunella's school. For some reason she sneaks into school and tried to steal Lunella's file, but is foiled by Moon Girl who in the middle of the fight trades bodies with Devil. Later Lunella, happy to have Devil Dinosaur back but having to deal with all of his dinosaur issues, transforms him into a human child with the help of her robot double, the Doombot head, and H.E.R.B.I.E. and shortly after enrolls him as a student claiming he is her brother. Princess feels slighted since she did not get to enjoy being the new girl much and complains to Wilson who informs some of his villainous contacts that they may have to deal with Moon Girl while Princess tries to bully them and draw attention back to herself. When that failed she had her father send her back to her old school.

Powers and abilities
Lunella Lafayette's primary gift is her advanced intelligence. She is dubbed the "smartest person in the whole world" by Amadeus Cho, implying that she is more intelligent than other geniuses in the Marvel Universe such as Bruce Banner, Tony Stark, Reed Richards, Victor Von Doom, and Cho himself. She uses her intelligence to build a wide variety of gadgets that she uses in battle. Her "battle armor" consists of boxing headgear, goggles, suspenders, a computerized utility belt, backpack, some minor weapons (notably her spring powered boxing glove), and a special pair of roller-skates.

As a result of her Inhuman heritage, Lunella possesses the ability to switch consciousness with Devil Dinosaur whenever she is angry or extremely hungry. Due to her intelligence, she is also capable of speech while in the body of the dinosaur. However, her regular body takes on a feral like personality due to Devil Dinosaur having taken over. She also possesses some manner of enhanced strength, but according to Captain Kree it is radically insignificant compared to her other abilities. She noticed that it tends to happen on the night of the full moon.

Reception

Accolades
 In 2020, Scary Mommy included Moon Girl in their "Looking For A Role Model? These 195+ Marvel Female Characters Are Truly Heroic" list.
 In 2021, CBR.com ranked Moon Girl 1st in their "Marvel: 10 Smartest Female Characters" list.
 In 2022, Collider ranked Moon Girl 2nd in their "10 Smartest Marvel Universe Geniuses" list.
In 2022, Screen Rant included Moon Girl in their "15 Smartest Characters In Marvel Comics" list and in their "10 Female Marvel Heroes That Should Come To The MCU" list.
In 2022, CBR.com ranked Moon Girl 1st in their "10 Smartest Marvel Scientists" list, 2nd in their "10 Smartest Tech-Powered Heroes" list, and 10th in their "10 Inhumans Who Should Join The Avengers" list.

Other versions
In the Warp World reality seen in Infinity Wars, Lunella is amalgamated with Squirrel Girl and rendered as Luneen Lafagreen. After witnessing a red squirrel undergoing Terrigenesis by growing to the size of a Tyrannosaurus, Luneen develops a translation helmet and decides to dub herself Moon Squirrel and fights crime with her new best friend.

In other media

Television
Moon Girl appears in Moon Girl and Devil Dinosaur, voiced by Diamond White. The series premiered on Disney Channel in 2023, and is co-produced by Marvel Animation and Disney Television Animation. This version is 13-years-old, dons a superhero suit, and wields gadgets she built herself.

Video games
 Moon Girl appears as an unlockable playable character in Marvel Future Fight.
 Moon Girl appears as an unlockable character in Marvel Avengers Academy, voiced by Cenophia Mitchell. She was first available during the event "Monsters Unleashed."
 Moon Girl appears as an unlockable playable character in Lego Marvel Super Heroes 2 via the "Champions Character Pack" DLC.
 Moon Girl appears in Marvel Snap.

Miscellaneous
 Lunella Lafayette makes a cameo appearance in Web Slingers: A Spider-Man Adventure as a rookie engineer of the Worldwide Engineering Brigade (WEB) program.
 The Moon Girl and Devil Dinosaur incarnation of Moon Girl appears as a meet-and-greet character at Avengers Campus.

Collected editions

References

External links
 Moon Girl at Comic Vine

Black people in comics
Comics characters introduced in 2015
Marvel Comics child superheroes
Marvel Comics female superheroes
Marvel Comics scientists
Fictional characters with spirit possession or body swapping abilities
Fictional inventors
Inhumans